Félix Legueu (12 August 1863 – 2 October 1939) was a French urologist and gynecologist born in Angers.

Biography 
Legueu was a clinical professor in Paris, a surgeon at Hôpital Necker and a member of the Académie de Médecine.

He specialized in genitourinary disorders. In 1913 he described a procedure for the closure of a vesicovaginal fistula, an abnormal passageway between the bladder and the vagina. That operation, today called the "Dittel-Forgue-Legueu operation", is also named after Drs. Leopold von Dittel (1815–1898) and Émile Forgue (1860–1943).

A few surgical instruments bear Legueu's name, such as the "Legueu bladder retractor" and the "Legueu bladder spatula".

Legueu died in his home from carbon monoxide poisoning.

Works

Lists of works 

 The most recent lists by Legueu himself are:
 
 
 Contemporary (but incomplete) list on SUDOC ; 35 titles as an author (Retrieved 2012-03-28).

Selected works 
 Des calculs du rein et de l'uretère au point de vue chirurgical, Steinheil. 1891, 150 p. Also online on Google Books
 
 (With Frédéric Labadie-Lagrave) Traité médico-chirurgical de gynécologie. 1898
 
 
 Leçons de clinique chirurgicale, Paris: Félix Alcan. 1902, 454 p. 
 
 
 
  (with a foreword by Jean Casimir Félix Guyon).
 (With Edmond Papin and G. Maingot) Exploration radiographique de l'appareil urinaire, 1913
 
 Cliniques de Necker
 Cliniques de Necker: 1912–1916, A. Maloine et fils. 1917, 378 p.
 Cliniques de Necker: 1918–1921, A. Maloine et fils. 1922
 (With Pierre Truchot and Bernard Fey) La pyéloscopie, Éditions médicales Norbert Maloine, Clinique urologique de Necker. 1927, 112 p. 
 (With Edmond Papin) Précis d'urologie, Maloine. 1937

Bibliography 
  (Written by former colleagues)

Notes

References

 Livre Rare Books (publications)
 NCBI Revisiting the Dittel-Forgue-Legueu operation

French urologists
1863 births
1939 deaths
French gynaecologists
People from Angers